MA Awal is a Bangladesh Awami League politician and a former Jatiya Sangsad member representing the Narayanganj-2 constituency since its inception until 1990.

References

Living people
Jatiya Party politicians
Awami League politicians
3rd Jatiya Sangsad members
4th Jatiya Sangsad members
Year of birth missing (living people)
Place of birth missing (living people)